Adolph II, Count of Nassau-Wiesbaden-Idstein (1386 – 16 July 1426) was a son of Walram IV, Count of Nassau-Idstein his wife, Bertha of Westerburg.  He married in 1418 with Margaret (1404–1442), a daughter of Bernard I, Margrave of Baden-Baden.  After his father's death in 1393, he ruled Nassau-Wiesbaden and Nassau-Idstein.

His children were:
 John II (1419–1480), who succeeded him
 Anna, married in 1438 with Everard III of Eppstein-Königstein
 Adolph (1422–1475) archbishop of Mainz.
 Walram
 Agnes (d. 1485), married in 1464 with Conrad IX of Bickenbach

House of Nassau
Counts of Nassau
1386 births
1426 deaths
15th-century German people